= Buy Me Once =

- Available in: English
- Founder: Tara Button
- Website: www.buymeonce.co.uk
- Launched: 2016

Buy Me Once is an online shopping website offering sustainable and durable consumer goods. The website was founded in 2016 by former advertising executive Tara Button, inspired by the durability and design of a Le Creuset cooking pot she had received. The original website incorporates United States and United Kingdom domains and stocks now more than 2,000 products.

== Objective ==
The aim of the site is to encourage people to "Love Things That Last" and to change human behaviour from short-term throwaway buying to longer term, mindful buying. Buy Me Once also did a raise through Crowdcube of £550k in 2019 with an investment from the Green Angel Syndicate, a network of smart investors who are committed to the transition to a greener economy.

== Publications ==
In 2018 HarperCollins published A Life Less Throwaway (ISBN 978-0008217716), a book by Button promoting the idea of "mindful curation" and her website. This book was also published in the US in June 2018 by Penguin Random House. More recently, the founder and CEO Tara Button was featured in the last ever print issue of Marie Claire as one of their "Future Shapers".
